Edwards is an unincorporated town, a post office, and a census-designated place (CDP) located in and governed by Eagle County, Colorado, United States. Edwards is the principal town of the Edwards, CO Micropolitan Statistical Area. The Edwards post office has the ZIP Code 81632. At the United States Census 2010, the population of the Edwards CDP was 10,266, while the population of the 81632 ZIP Code Tabulation Area was 10,267. The Edwards Metropolitan District provides services.

History
The Edwards Post Office has been in operation since 1883. The community was named after Melvin Edwards, a local postal official.

Geography
Edwards is in the valley of the Eagle River and extends southwards up the valleys of Lake Creek and Colorow Creek, at the north end of the Sawatch Range. It is bordered to the east by the town of Avon. U.S. Route 6 runs through the center of Edwards on the south side of the Eagle River, while Interstate 70 runs through the CDP north of the river, with access from Exit 163.

Demographics

Ski resorts
Edwards is in a favorable location for skiers and riders.

See also

Outline of Colorado
Index of Colorado-related articles
State of Colorado
Colorado cities and towns
Colorado census designated places
Colorado counties
Eagle County, Colorado
List of statistical areas in Colorado
Edwards, CO Micropolitan Statistical Area

References

External links

Edwards @ Colorado.com
Edwards @ UncoverColorado.com
Edwards Metropolitan District website
Eagle County website

Census-designated places in Eagle County, Colorado
Census-designated places in Colorado